The Michael Moore Trophy is a rugby league trophy usually contested biannually during the National Rugby League season, in matches between the Melbourne Storm and the New Zealand Warriors. The Michael Moore Trophy was introduced in 2000 following the death of Melbourne Storm's inaugural football manager, Michael Moore, on 6 February 2000 in Auckland, New Zealand.

Beginning in 2009, matches are regularly scheduled on 25 April, to coincide with ANZAC Day commemorations in Melbourne, with the game usually played in the evening at AAMI Park.

Melbourne are currently on an 13-game winning streak against the Warriors, having held the trophy since 2016.

Michael Moore
Michael Moore (1965-2000) was the inaugural football manager of the Melbourne Storm, controlling the day to day running of football operations. He joined Melbourne from the Brisbane Broncos, where he was part of that club's strength and conditioning program. Moore played rugby league in Queensland with Brisbane Brothers from 1984-1992, before finishing his playing career with Brisbane Souths in 1993. As well as his role with the Brisbane Broncos, he headed up the conditioning program for the Brisbane Bullets in 1996/97. 

Outside of sport, Moore was a physical education teacher for two years in 1988-1989, and was a physical activities officer with the Queensland Police Service for nine years before moving to Victoria.

Moore's sudden death was devastating to the tightknit Melbourne Storm club, with the Storm players jerseys carrying "Michael Moore 2000 Season" embroidery during 2000. Melbourne renamed the "Clubman of the Year" Medal in his honour, with the award combined with the Chairman's Award to become the Michael Moore Club Person of the Year trophy in 2005.

Michael Moore was survived by his wife Tracey, and children Meg, Harry, and Georgia.

Results

2000-2009
2000

2001

2002

2003

2004

2005

2006

2007

2008

2009

2010-2019
2010

2011

2012

2013

2014

2015

2016

2017

2018

2019

2020-present
2020

2021

2022

Head To Head 
2000 - 2022

Overall 1998-2022 (including finals)

Spirit of ANZAC Medal
In games played on ANZAC Day in Melbourne, a Spirit of ANZAC Medal is awarded to the player in the match considered to best exemplify the ANZAC spirit – skill, courage, self-sacrifice, teamwork and fair play.

Winners
 2009 — Adam Blair (Melbourne Storm)
 2010 — Cooper Cronk (Melbourne Storm)
 2011 — Krisnan Inu (New Zealand Warriors)
 2012 — Kevin Proctor (Melbourne Storm)
 2013 — Ryan Hoffman (Melbourne Storm)
 2014 — Sebastine Ikahihifo (New Zealand Warriors)
 2015 — Daly Cherry-Evans (Manly Sea Eagles)
 2016 — Tohu Harris (Melbourne Storm)
 2017 — Nelson Asofa-Solomona (Melbourne Storm)
 2018 — Billy Slater (Melbourne Storm)
 2019 — Cameron Smith (Melbourne Storm)
 2020 — Not awarded
 2021 — Jahrome Hughes (Melbourne Storm)
 2022 — Ryan Papenhuyzen (Melbourne Storm)

Notes

See also

 Rivalries in the National Rugby League

References

External links

Melbourne Storm
New Zealand Warriors
Rugby league rivalries
ANZAC (Australia)
Awards established in 2000
Rugby league trophies and awards
Oceanian sports trophies and awards
2000 establishments in Oceania